Ralaniten (developmental code name EPI-002) is an N-terminal domain antiandrogen which was never marketed. It is a derivative of bisphenol A and one of the four stereoisomers of EPI-001. A prodrug of ralaniten, ralaniten acetate (EPI-506), was under development for the treatment of prostate cancer.

See also
 EPI-7386

References

Abandoned drugs
Alkylating agents
2,2-Bis(4-hydroxyphenyl)propanes
Halohydrins
Nonsteroidal antiandrogens
Organochlorides
Polyols
Glycerols